Cuapetes amymone is a species of shrimp found in the Pacific and Indian Oceans. It was first named by Johannes Govertus de Man in 1902.

References

Palaemonoidea
Crustaceans described in 1902
Taxa named by Johannes Govertus de Man